The 1905–06 Auburn Tigers men's basketball team represented Auburn University in the 1905–06 college basketball season. This was the first men's basketball team ever to represent Auburn University. The team's head coach was Mike Donahue, who was in his first season at Auburn. The team played their home games at The Gymnasium in Auburn, Alabama. They finished the season 5–1–1.

References

Auburn Tigers men's basketball seasons
Auburn
Auburn Tigers
Auburn Tigers